Gusevo is a rural locality (a village) in Vinogradovsky District, Arkhangelsk Oblast, Russia. The population was 2 as of 2010.

Geography 
Gusevo is located 20 km southeast of Bereznik (the district's administrative centre) by road. Korbala is the nearest rural locality.

References 

Rural localities in Vinogradovsky District